New York's 120th State Assembly district is one of the 150 districts in the New York State Assembly. It has been represented by Republican Minority Leader William Barclay since 2003.

Geography
This district encompasses most of Oswego County and portions of Onondaga County and Jefferson County.

Recent election results

2022

2020

2018

2016

2014

2012

References 

120
Oswego County, New York
Onondaga County, New York
Jefferson County, New York